In semiconductor fabrication, the International Technology Roadmap for Semiconductors (ITRS) defines the 10 nm process as the MOSFET technology node following the 14 nm node. 10 nm class denotes chips made using process technologies between 10 and 20 nm.

All production 10 nm processes are based on FinFET (fin field-effect transistor) technology, a type of multi-gate MOSFET technology that is a non-planar evolution of planar silicon CMOS technology. Samsung first started their production of 10 nm-class chips in 2013 for their multi-level cell (MLC) flash memory chips, followed by their SoCs using their 10 nm process in 2016. TSMC began commercial production of 10 nm chips in 2016, and Intel later began production of 10nm chips in 2018.

Since 2009, however, "node" has become a commercial name for marketing purposes that indicates new generations of process technologies, without any relation to gate length, metal pitch or gate pitch. For example, GlobalFoundries' 7 nm processes are similar to Intel's 10 nm process, thus the conventional notion of a process node has become blurred. TSMC and Samsung's 10 nm processes are somewhere between Intel's 14 nm and 10 nm processes in transistor density. The transistor density (number of transistors per square millimetre) is more important than transistor size, since smaller transistors no longer necessarily mean improved performance, or an increase in the number of transistors.

Background
The ITRS's original naming of this technology node was "11 nm". According to the 2007 edition of the roadmap, by the year 2022, the half-pitch (i.e., half the distance between identical features in an array) for a DRAM should be 11 nm.

In 2008, Pat Gelsinger, at the time serving as Intel's Chief Technology Officer, said that Intel saw a 'clear way' towards the 10 nm node.

In 2011, Samsung announced plans to introduce the 10nm process the following year. In 2012, Samsung announced eMMC flash memory chips that are produced using the 10nm process.

In actuality, "10 nm" as it is generally understood in 2018 is only in high-volume production at Samsung. GlobalFoundries has skipped 10 nm, Intel has not yet started high-volume 10 nm production, due to yield issues, and TSMC has considered 10 nm to be a short-lived node, mainly dedicated to processors for Apple during 2017–2018, moving on to 7 nm in 2018.

There is also a distinction to be made between 10 nm as marketed by foundries and 10 nm as marketed by DRAM companies.

Technology production history
In April 2013, Samsung announced that it had begun mass production of multi-level cell (MLC) flash memory chips using a 10nm-class process, which, according to Tom's Hardware, Samsung defined as "a process technology node somewhere between 10-nm and 20-nm". On 17 October 2016, Samsung Electronics announced mass production of SoC chips at 10 nm. The technology's main announced challenge has been triple patterning for its metal layer.

TSMC began commercial production of 10 nm chips in early 2016, before moving onto mass production in early 2017.

On 21 April 2017, Samsung started shipping their Galaxy S8 smartphone which uses the company's version of the 10 nm processor. On 12 June 2017, Apple delivered second-generation iPad Pro tablets powered with TSMC-produced Apple A10X chips using the 10 nm FinFET process.

On 12 September 2017, Apple announced the Apple A11, a 64-bit ARM-based system on a chip, manufactured by TSMC using a 10 nm FinFET process and containing 4.3 billion transistors on a die of 87.66 mm2.

In April 2018, Intel announced a delay in volume production of 10 nm mainstream CPUs until sometime in 2019. In July the exact time was further pinned down to the holiday season. In the meantime, however, they did release a low-power 10 nm mobile chip, albeit exclusive to Chinese markets and with much of the chip disabled.

In June 2018 at VLSI 2018, Samsung announced their 11LPP and 8LPP processes. 11LPP is a hybrid based on Samsung 14 nm and 10 nm technology. 11LPP is based on their 10 nm BEOL, not their 20 nm BEOL like their 14LPP. 8LPP is based on their 10LPP process.

Nvidia released their GeForce 30 series GPUs in September 2020. They are made on a custom version of Samsung's 8 nm process, called Samsung 8N, with a transistor density of 44.56 million transistors per mm2.

10 nm process nodes

Foundry

Transistor gate pitch is also referred to as CPP (contacted poly pitch) and interconnect pitch is also referred to as MMP (minimum metal pitch). Samsung reported their 10 nm process as having a 64 nm transistor gate pitch and 48 nm interconnect pitch. TSMC reported their 10 nm process as having a 64 nm transistor gate pitch and 42 nm interconnect pitch. Further investigation by Tech Insights revealed these values to be false and they have been updated accordingly. In addition, the transistor fin height of Samsung's 10 nm process was updated by MSSCORPS CO at SEMICON Taiwan 2017. GlobalFoundries decided not to develop a 10 nm node, because it believed it would be short lived. Samsung's 8 nm process is the company's last to exclusively use DUV lithography.

DRAM "10 nm class"

For the DRAM industry, the term "10 nm-class" is often used and this dimension generally refers to the half-pitch of the active area. The "10 nm" foundry structures are generally much larger.

Generally 10 nm class refers to DRAM with a 10-19 nm feature size, and was first introduced c. 2016. As of 2020 there are three generations of 10 nm class DRAM : 1x nm (19-17 nm, Gen1); 1y nm (16-14 nm, Gen2); and 1z nm (13-11 nm, Gen3). 3rd Generation "1z" DRAM was first introduced c.2019 by Samsung, and was initially stated to be produced using ArF lithography without the use of EUV lithography; subsequent production did utilise EUV lithography.

Beyond 1z Samsung names its next node (fourth generation 10 nm class) DRAM : "D1a" (for 2021), and beyond that D1b (expected 2022); whilst Micron refers to succeeding "nodes" as "D1α" and "D1β". Micron announced volume shipment of 1α class DRAM in early 2021.

References

00010